PVHS may refer to:
Paloma Valley High School, Menifee, California
Palos Verdes High School, Palos Verdes Estates, California
Penobscot Valley High School, Howland, Maine
Pojoaque Valley High School, Pojoaque, New Mexico
Piedra Vista High School, Farmington, New Mexico
Pinole Valley High School, Pinole, California
Palo Verde High School, Las Vegas, Nevada
Pahrump Valley High School, Pahrump, Nevada 
Paradise Valley High School, Paradise Valley, Arizona
Park Vista Community High School, Lake Worth, Florida
Pascack Valley High School, Hillsdale, New Jersey
Passaic Valley High School, Little Falls, New Jersey
Pleasant Valley High School (Jacksonville, Alabama), Jacksonville, Alabama
Pleasant Valley High School (California), Chico, California
Pleasant Valley High School (Iowa), Pleasant Valley, Iowa
Pleasant Valley High School (Pennsylvania), Brodheadsville, Pennsylvania
Ponte Vedra High School, Ponte Vedra Beach, Florida
Poudre Valley Health System, Larimer County, Colorado
Perkiomen Valley High School (Pennsylvania), Collegeville, Pennsylvania, see Perkiomen Valley School District
Panther Valley High School, Borough of Summit Hill, Pennsylvania 

Educational institution disambiguation pages